Kurds in the Netherlands may refer to people born in or residing in the Netherlands of Kurdish origin.

There are different accounts for the actual Kurdish population within the Netherlands. "The number of Kurds in the Netherlands is not clear, as the Kurds hold different nationalities (Turkish, Iranian, Iraqi and Syrian) and are categorized on the basis of their nationalities in governmental statistics; the figures run from 15,000 up to almost 100,000." Other sources claim that the number of ethnic Kurds in the Netherlands is around 70,000 people.

The Kurdish community in the Netherlands among which the Turkish Kurds and Iraqi Kurds make up the largest group of Kurds in the Netherlands, exceeding the numbers of Iranian Kurds and Syrian Kurds.

Immigration history
In the Netherlands, Kurdish immigrant workers from Turkey first arrived in the second half of the 1960s. Thousands of Kurdish refugees and political refugees fled from Turkey during the 1970s and onward, from Iraq and Iran during the 1980s and 1990s, and from Syria especially during the Syrian Civil War.

Political activism
On 6 October 2014, the Kurds in the Netherlands "stormed the national parliament building in The Hague on Monday night in a protest against ISIS" offensive on the Syrian town of Ayn al-Arab, known in Kurdish as Kobani.

On 13 May 2015, "Dutch police raided a secret meeting of members of the Kurdistan Workers Party (PKK) in the Netherlands". The office of Dutch prosecutors explained "that the Kurdish PKK recruits young Kurds in the Netherlands for its armed struggle against the Turkish army".

On 8 June 2015, the Kurds in the Netherlands celebrated the success of "the left-wing pro-Kurdish party, which won 13 percent of the votes in the Turkish parliamentary elections, leading to much joy and celebrations among Kurds.". The Kurdish minority within the state of Turkey "who want more autonomy for Turkish Kurdistan, but Turkey refuses to give it".

See also 
Kurdistan Region–Netherlands relations
Kurdish population
Immigration to the Netherlands

References

Ethnic groups in the Netherlands
Middle Eastern diaspora in the Netherlands
Muslim communities in Europe
Kurdish people